Frederick E.O. Toye (born September 26, 1967) is an American television director and occasional producer. His directorial work in 2016 includes an episode in the final season of The Good Wife, the 100th episode of Person of Interest, several episodes for BrainDead and the miniseries 11.22.63, and for the HBO series Westworld.

Early life and education 
Toye attended the University of California, Santa Barbara and graduated with a B.A.

Career
Toye began his career as a production assistant for five years and an editor for 15 years, before becoming a television director. He is a frequent collaborator of J. J. Abrams.  He has directed, edited, and co-produced several episodes of the ABC series, Alias, as well as serving as a producer and occasional director on the Fox science fiction series Fringe.

He has also directed episodes of: Lost, Ghost Whisperer, Brothers & Sisters, The 4400, Moonlight, V, CSI: NY, Chuck, The Good Wife, Falling Skies,  Person of Interest, and other series.

Television work
11.22.63
episode 1.02 "The Kill Floor"
episode 1.04 "The Eyes of Texas"
The 4400
episode 3.11 "The Gospel According to Collier"
Alias
episode 4.13 "Tuesday"
episode 5.02 "...1..."
episode 5.04 "Mockingbird"
episode 5.13 "30 Seconds"
episode 5.16 "Reprisal"
Almost Human
episode 1.12 "Beholder"
American Gods
episode 2.02 "The Begulling Man"
The Boys
episode 1.04 "The Female of the Species"
episode 2.04 "Nothing Like It in the World"
episode 3.04 "Glorious Five Year Plan”
BrainDead
episode 1.06 "Notes Toward a Post-Reagan Theory of Party Alliance, Tribalism, and Loyalty: Past as Prologue"
episode 1.07 "The Power of Euphemism: How Torture Became a Matter of Debate in American Politics"
Brothers & Sisters
episode 1.06 "For the Children"
episode 1.10 "Light the Lights"
Chuck
episode 1.12 "Chuck Versus the Undercover Lover"
episode 3.05 "Chuck Versus the First Class"
episode 3.15 "Chuck Versus the Role Models"
episode 4.17 "Chuck Versus the First Bank of Evil"
episode 5.09 "Chuck Versus the Kept Man"
CSI: NY
episode 5.02 "Page Turner"
episode 7.15 "Vigilante"
episode 8.01 "Indelible"
Evil
episode 1.09 "Exorcism Part 2"
Falling Skies
episode 1.04 "Grace"
episode 1.05 "Silent Kill"
Fringe
episode 1.03 "The Ghost Network"
episode 1.09 "The Dreamscape"
episode 1.11 "Bound"
episode 1.15 "Inner Child"
episode 1.19 "The Road Not Taken"
episode 2.11 "Unearthed"
episode 3.15 "Subject 13"
episode 4.16 "Nothing As It Seems"
Ghost Whisperer
episode 2.04 "The Ghost Within"
episode 2.18 "Children of Ghosts"
episode 3.07 "Unhappy Medium"
episode 3.09 "All Ghosts Lead to Grandview"
episode 3.14 "The Gravesitter"
The Good Wife
episode 1.22 "Hybristophilia" 
episode 2.20 "Foreign Affairs" 
episode 3.04 "Feeding the Rat" 
episode 3.13 "Bitcoin for Dummies"  
episode 3.14 "Another Ham Sandwich"  
episode 4.05 "Waiting for the Knock"  
episode 4.19 "The Wheels of Justice" 
episode 5.07 "The Next Week"
episode 6.05 "Shiny Objects"
Hawaii Five-0
episode 1.11 "Palekaiko"
episode 2.19 "Kalele"
episode 3.02 "Kanalua"
Invasion
episode 1.16 "The Fittest"
Lost
episode 3.18 "D.O.C."
Melrose Place
episode 1.04 "Vine"
Miami Medical
episode 1.12 "Down to the Bone"
Moonlight
episode 1.02 "Out of the Past"
episode 1.04 "Fever"
episode 1.16 "Sonata"
Person of Interest
episode 1.07 "Witness"
episode 1.21 "Many Happy Returns"
episode 2.07 "Critical"
episode 2.15 "Booked Solid"
episode 3.02 "Nothing to Hide"
episode 3.09 "The Crossing"
episode 3.21 "Beta"
episode 4.03 "Wingman"
episode 4.16 "Blunt"
episode 4.21 "Asylum"
episode 5.10 "The Day the World Went Away"
Revolution
episode 1.10 "Nobody's Fault But Mine"
episode 1.19 "Children of Men"
episode 2.05 "One Riot, One Ranger"
episode 2.17 "Why We Fight"
Rizzoli & Isles
episode 2.09 "Gone Daddy Gone"
episode 3.07 "Crazy for You"
See
episode 1.07 "The Lavender Road"
Snowpiercer
episode 1.04 "Without Their Maker"
episode 1.05 "Justice Never Boarded"
Undercovers
episode 1.09 "A Night to Forget"
V
episode 1.03 "A Bright New Day"
episode 1.09 "Heretic's Fork"
Vegas
episode 1.13 "Road Trip"
The Walking Dead
episode 11.03 "Hunted"
episode 11.04 "Rendition"
Watchmen
episode 1.09 "See How They Fly"
Westworld
episode 1.06 "The Adversary"
episode 1.07 "Trompe L'Oeil"
episode 2.10 "The Passenger"

References

External links

1967 births
American television directors
Television producers from California
Living people
Businesspeople from Los Angeles
Visual effects artists
University of California, Santa Barbara alumni
American film editors